Edwin Waugh (1817–1890) was an English poet.

Life
The son of a shoemaker, Waugh was born in Rochdale, Lancashire, England and, after some schooling, was apprenticed to a printer, Thomas Holden, at the age of 12. While still a young man he worked as a journeyman printer, travelling all over Britain, but eventually returned to his old job in Rochdale.

Waugh read eagerly, and in 1847 became assistant secretary to the Lancashire Public School Association and went to work in Manchester. In Manchester he started publishing descriptions of rural rambles, and the reception of his works encouraged him to persevere. By 1860 he was able to become a full-time writer; but in 1881 he was in poor health and was granted a Civil List pension of £90 p.a.

Death and legacy
Waugh died at his home in New Brighton, Cheshire, in 1890 and was buried in St. Paul's churchyard on Kersal Moor.  Waugh's Well was built in 1866 to commemorate him at Foe Edge Farm, on the moors above Edenfield, Rossendale where he spent much time writing. Foe Edge, was completely demolished by the North West Water Authority in the mid-1970s and no trace remains of the building. There is a monument in Broadfield Park, Rochdale which commemorates Margaret Rebecca Lahee, Oliver Ormerod, John Trafford Clegg and Edwin Waugh.

Works
Waugh first attracted attention with sketches of Lancashire life and character in the Manchester Examiner. His first book Sketches of Lancashire Life and Localities was published in 1855 while he was working as a traveller for a Manchester printing firm. He wrote also prose: Factory Folk, Besom Ben Stories, and The Chimney Corner.  His Lancashire dialect songs, collected as Poems and Songs (1859), brought him local fame. He has been called "the Lancashire Burns." His most famous poem is "Come whoam to thi childer an' me", 1856.

See also 

John Collier (caricaturist)

References

External links 
 
 
 

Edwin Waugh at gerald-massey.org.uk

1817 births
1890 deaths
People from Rochdale
English male poets
19th-century English poets